LRVI FC is a United States Virgin Islands football club based in Saint Thomas. The club competes in the U.S. Virgin Islands Premier League, the top tier of USVI football. Founder Joseph Limeburner is the current club President LRVI FC is the only club in the United States Virgin Islands officially licensed by CONCACAF.

History
The club was founded as Laraza FC in 2006 by Joseph Limeburner who has also served as the coach for the under-17 and under-20 national teams and assistant coach of the under-23 national team. The senior team originally began playing in the St. Thomas League for the 2006/2007 season. By the 2018–19 season, the team was competing in the Premier League as the St. Thomas League and St. Croix League combined for the first time. 

In 2019 four LRVI FC players, including senior internationals Connor Querrard and Jimson St. Louis, went on trial at the academies of seven professional clubs in Spain. Since 2013 the club's youth sides have been participating in numerous competitions abroad including the Disney Cup.

Stadium
The club's stadium, Castaway Park, has the first artificial turf surface on St. Thomas.

Domestic history
Key

References

External links
Official website
Official Facebook
USVI Soccer Association profile

Soccer clubs in the United States Virgin Islands
Association football clubs established in 2006